, commonly known as Daihatsu, is a Japanese automobile manufacturer and one of the oldest surviving Japanese internal combustion engine manufacturers. The company's headquarters are located in Ikeda, Osaka Prefecture. 

Historically, Daihatsu was well known for building three-wheeled vehicles and off-road vehicles, while currently the company offers a range of kei car models, along with kei trucks, kei vans and other larger small cars in Japan. The company also produces entry-level compact cars in Japan and Southeast Asia, which are also supplied to global emerging markets under the Toyota brand.

, Daihatsu's presence has been limited to Japan, Indonesia, and Malaysia (as Perodua), where the company has significant research and development resources, manufacturing facilities and sales operations.

The company has been a wholly-owned subsidiary of the Toyota Motor Corporation since August 2016. , Daihatsu sales account for 4 per cent of the Toyota Group's vehicle sales' total.

Name
The name "Daihatsu" is a combination of the first symbol (kanji) of Ōsaka (大) and the first of the word . In the new combination the reading of the "大" is changed from "ō" to "dai", giving "dai hatsu".

History

Daihatsu was formed in March 1951 as a successor to Hatsudoki Seizo Co. Ltd, founded in 1907, as part of Hatsudoki's major restructure. Hatsudoki's formation was largely influenced by the Engineering Department's faculty of Osaka University, to develop a gasoline-powered engine for small, stationary power plants. From the beginning of the company until 1930, when a prototype three-wheeler truck was considered and proposed, Hatsudoki's focus was largely steam engines for Japanese National Railways and included rail carriages for passenger transportation. The company then focused on railroad diesel engines, working with Niigata Engineering, and Shinko Engineering Co., Ltd. Before the company began to manufacture automobiles, their primary Japanese competitor was Yanmar for diesel engines that were not installed in a commercial truck to provide motivation.

The company's decision to focus on automobile production and related technologies was influenced by the early days of automobile manufacturing in Japan during the late 1920s and 1930s, when both Ford and General Motors had opened factories in Japan and enjoyed a considerable market share. Ford opened a factory at Yokohama in March 1925 and in 1927 GM opened Osaka Assembly until both factories were appropriated by the Imperial Japanese Government before World War II.

During the 1960s, Daihatsu began exporting its range to Europe, where it did not have major sales success until well into the 1980s. In Japan, the majority of Daihatsu models occupies the kei jidōsha (or kei car) segment.

Daihatsu was an independent automaker until Toyota became a major shareholder in 1967 as the Japanese government intended to open up the domestic market. According to Toyota, it was first approached by Sanwa Bank, banker of Daihatsu. In 1995, Toyota increased its shareholding in the company from 16.8 percent to 33.4 percent by acquiring shares from other shareholders: banks and insurance companies. At the time, the company was producing mini-vehicles and some small cars under contract for Toyota. Toyota, by owning more than a one-third stake, would be able to veto shareholder resolutions at the annual meeting. In 1998, Toyota increased its holding in the company to 51.2 percent by purchasing shares from its major shareholders including financial institutions.

Daihatsu pulled out of the European market by 2013, citing the persistently strong yen, which makes it difficult for the company to make a profit from its export business. Following the financial crisis of 2007–2008 Daihatsu's sales in Europe plummeted, from 58,000 in 2007 to 12,000 in 2011.

In August 2011, Daihatsu invested 20 billion yen ($238.9 million) in Indonesia to build a factory that produces low-cost cars under the Low Cost Green Car scheme. The construction had been initialized on 70,000 square meters on May 27, 2011 and started operations at the end of 2012, producing up to 100,000 cars per year.

In August 2016, Daihatsu became a wholly owned subsidiary of Toyota Motor Corporation. In January 2017, Daihatsu and Toyota jointly established an internal company to develop compact vehicles for emerging markets called the 'Emerging-market Compact Car Company'. Under the internal company, Daihatsu is responsible of product planning and quality planning of the vehicles, while both Toyota and Daihatsu are jointly responsible of product and business planning. To support the company, Toyota Motor Asia Pacific Engineering and Manufacturing Co., Ltd. (TMAP-EM) in Thailand was renamed to Toyota Daihatsu Engineering and Manufacturing Co., Ltd. (TDEM).

In October 2016, Daihatsu and Toyota announced a new vehicle architecture called the Daihatsu New Global Architecture (DNGA) was being developed. The second-generation Mira e:S was revealed as the first DNGA model in 2017, although the company later revised the definition of DNGA and launched the fourth-generation Tanto claiming it as the first DNGA model instead.

From 2020 to 2022, Daihatsu trained employees from less-profitable sister company Toyota Motor East Japan to improve the latter's systems on development and production of small cars.

Company timeline

 1907 – Hatsudoki Seizo Co., Ltd. founded
 1951 – Company renamed: Daihatsu Motor Co., Ltd.
 1963 – Daihatsu Compagno which utilized multiple bodystyles on one platform was presented. The long running D logo introduced.
 1964 – The millionth Daihatsu is built on September 1.
 1965 – The Daihatsu Compagno Berlina went on sale in the United Kingdom, the first Japanese car to be marketed there.
 1967 – Starts cooperation with Toyota Motor Corporation
 1969 – The two millionth Daihatsu is built.
 1971 – First generation of the Daihatsu Delta Truck model launched in Japan, a Toyota influenced four wheeled six ton cargo lorry.
 1975 – Begins to supply diesel engines to the original SEMAL motor vehicle company of Portugal for the new PORTARO 4X4 and TAGUS 4X4 offroad vehicles.
 1980 – Daihatsu builds its three millionth kei car
 1987 – Daihatsu enters the US automotive market with the Hijet
 1988 – Daihatsu introduces the Rocky and Charade in the US market
 1992 – Daihatsu shuts down US sales in February and ceases production of US-spec vehicles
 1998 – Toyota gains a controlling interest (51.2%) in Daihatsu Motor Co., Ltd.
 2011 – Daihatsu states that sales of Daihatsu motor cars will cease across Europe on January 31, 2013
 2011 – Daihatsu invests 20 billion yen ($238.9 million) in Indonesia to build a factory that produces low-cost cars.
 2016 – Toyota purchases Daihatsu's remaining assets, and therefore makes Daihatsu a wholly owned subsidiary

Export markets
Daihatsu's first export was in 1953, and by 1980 half a million Daihatsu vehicles had been exported. In 1979 a European main office was established in Brussels, tasked with controlling and expanding Western European exports. Since the late 1990s, its exports have been steadily contracting. This has been partially offset by the sale of Daihatsu vehicles through the Toyota channel, and the sale of technology to Malaysia's Perodua. Daihatsu has also supplied cars under different badges to various automakers in the past. The company currently provides engines and transmissions to Malaysia's Perodua, which manufactures and markets rebadged Daihatsu cars locally, and sold a small number of Perodua cars in the United Kingdom and Ireland until 2012.

Asia and Oceania

Following the 1997 Asian financial crisis, Daihatsu closed their plants in Thailand and withdrew from the market entirely. Until withdrawing in March 1998 they had mostly been selling the Mira range in Thailand; the Mira was also built there with certain local modifications.

After the launch of Perodua, Daihatsu's Malaysian operations were scaled down to concentrate exclusively on the commercial vehicles market, selling its Delta and Gran Max commercial truck chassis; Daihatsu had formerly sold Charades and Miras in the country since it first began operations in Malaysia as a joint venture in 1980. In Indonesia, Daihatsu remains a major player.

It was reported on March 31, 2005 that Toyota would withdraw Daihatsu from the Australian market after sales fell heavily in the years leading up, in spite of the overall new-car market in Australia growing 7%. Daihatsu ended its Australian operations in March 2006 after almost 40 years there. At the time the marque sold the Charade, Copen, Delta, Sirion and Terios models.

Toyota New Zealand announced on April 8, 2013 that sales of new Daihatsu vehicles in the country would cease by the end of the year, citing a lack of products that would comply with future NZ regulatory standards. No additional new vehicles were being imported as of the announcement date.

The Americas

Daihatsu's operations in Chile, where Daihatsu is well known for its 1970s models such as the Charade or Cuore, were also threatened after low sales in 2004 and 2005. Toyota has stated that it intended to persist in the Chilean market, where only the Terios model was available until it was rebranded as the Toyota Rush in August 2016, as Daihatsu left that market.

In Trinidad and Tobago, Daihatsu has had a market presence since 1958 when its Mark I Midget was a popular choice among market tradesmen. From 1978 until 2001, a local dealer marketed the Charmant, Rocky, Fourtrak, and then later, the Terios and Grand Move which were popular. The Delta chassis remained popular from its introduction in 1985 until today. Toyota Trinidad and Tobago Ltd. (a wholly owned subsidiary of Toyota Japan) now markets Daihatsu Terios, YRV and Sirion under stiff competition.

In the United States, Daihatsus were marketed from 1988 until 1992 but were hampered by the 1990s recession, and that their products had very little impact as the company's compact and fuel economic cars did not align with the perceived needs of American customers. Only the Charade and the Rocky were sold. Beginning in 1987, Daihatsu also sold the Hijet in the United States as an off-road only utility vehicle. The US Head Office was located at 4422 Corporate Center Drive in Los Alamitos, California. It is currently the location of Timken Bearing Inspection Inc.

Daihatsu and Bombardier Inc. had been planning to open an assembly plant for the Charade in Canada in 1989, with the ultimate goal of building a small car of Bombardier's design to market in North America. These plans didn't eventuate. After Daihatsu's withdrawal from the US market, Toyota, which had recently purchased a controlling interest in Daihatsu, continued to provide after-sales support for existing Daihatsu customers through at least 2002.

Europe

European imports began in 1979. The company had little or no presence in countries with protectionist barriers such as France and Spain - where local manufacturers also targeted the same market segment as Daihatsu. Daihatsu sold mainly in the United Kingdom, Germany, and the Netherlands. In Italy, Daihatsu partnered with local small car experts Innocenti in 1982 as a backdoor to several continental markets. The Italian manufacturer used Daihatsu drivetrains in their cars from 1983 until 1993.

Beginning in 1992, Piaggio manufactured the Hijet microvan and truck locally, as the Piaggio Porter, Innocenti Porter, or Daihatsu Hijet. It remains available as of 2020 and is also built in India. In the mid-1980s Daihatsu also briefly imported Charades assembled by Alfa Romeo's South African subsidiary to Italy, in another effort to circumvent import restrictions.

Daihatsu announced on January 13, 2011 that sales of Daihatsu motor cars would cease across Europe on January 31, 2013. This was due to the increasing strength of the Japanese yen, which had increased prices beyond competitive levels. Daihatsu had no stock of new Daihatsu cars in the UK at the time, and did not intend to import any more cars in the interim period.

Africa
From 1983 until 1985, Alfa Romeo's South African branch assembled the Charade for local sales and for export to Italy. In April 2015, Daihatsu pulled out of South Africa.

Electrics and hybrids
Daihatsu has had a long-running development program for electric vehicles, beginning with the production of "pavilion cars" for the 1970 Osaka World Expo and continuing with the production of golf carts and vehicles for institutional use, such as the DBC-1. An electric version of the company's Fellow Max kei car also followed, the beginning of a series of prototypes. The 1973 oil crisis provided further impetus and at the 20th Tokyo Motor Show (1973) Daihatsu displayed a 550 W electric trike (TR-503E), the BCX-III electric car prototype and daihatsu's own EV1. 

Daihatsu showed more prototypes through the 1970s, for instance at the 1979 Sydney Motor Show, and then joined the Japanese Electric Vehicle Association's PREET program (Public Rent and Electronic Towncar) with an electric version of the Max Cuore kei car. The program allowed registered users access to the cars with a magnetized card and charged according to mileage used.

In November 1974, Daihatsu released the Hallo (ES38V), a tilting trike powered by an electric motor and two 12V batteries.

In December 2011, Daihatsu released the Pico EV Concept, a quadricycle powered by an electric motor.

The company released a mild hybrid technology called the Daihatsu Mild Hybrid System in 2007, and is used in the Hijet/Atrai Hybrid-IV.

In November 2021, Daihatsu released their first mass-produced full hybrid system. Marketed as the "e-Smart Hybrid", it is a series hybrid system as opposed to Toyota's more advanced parallel hybrid technology. The technology was first used by the hybrid version of the A200 series Rocky. It is also used by the Toyota-branded model, the Raize under the common "Hybrid Synergy Drive" branding.

Motorcycles
In 1973, Daihatsu presented an electric tilting trike at the Tokyo Motor Show. This entered production in 1975 as the Hallo. Daihatsu also released a petrol powered version using a 50 cc two-stroke engine.

Logo
Daihatsu is well known with its signature D logo. The D logo debuted in September 1963 on the Compagno as the first automobile with the Daihatsu D logo. From its establishment in 1951 until 1969, Daihatsu also used a Ford-like logo, with Daihatsu vintage-style cursive wordmark (outside Japan) and Daihatsu wordmark in katakana, written inside an ellipse. Daihatsu had a second logo, based on a stylized drawing of Osaka Castle. The script logo remained in use as Daihatsu's corporate logo and appeared on Daihatsu product catalogues and brochures until November 1969. 

In the 1950s and 1960s Daihatsu was commonly referred to as Japan's Ford, and as the Japanese equivalent to Ford. In December 1969, this logo was discontinued and Daihatsu officially used the D logo as its corporate logo. Except in Indonesia, the first Daihatsu logo was used in brochures until about 1977 or 1978. The famous D logo is a stylized, modernized version of the D in the earlier logo and resembles the da in katakana.

The D logo as the corporate logo, the white D placed inside the red rectangle, has been used from late 1969 onwards. The first version of the D logo, surrounded with circle, was used on Daihatsu automobiles from 1963 until 1979. From 1979 to 1989, the D logo was surrounded by a dark grey rectangle. In November 1989, following the launch of Toyota's famous current logo, the D logo was surrounded by an oval, and made in chrome. The chrome D logo is used today.

Vehicles

Plants and production

Japan
Daihatsu's first, and oldest factory, called Ikeda Plant 1 was built in May 1939 in Ikeda, Osaka. The second factory was built May 1961 and is called Ikeda Plant 2. It houses the Osaka HQ office that was established March 1965. The company maintains an office in Tokyo, that was originally opened as Hatsudoki Seizo Co. Ltd. in June 1933 the Daihatsu Building. 

Daihatsu currently has two factories in Ryūō, Shiga. The first factory was opened in April 1974, and the second one in January 1989. Daihatsu opened a factory in April 1973 in Ōyamazaki, Kyoto. Daihatsu opened two factories in Nakatsu, Ōita starting in November 2004 with Nakatsu Plant 1, followed by Nakatsu Plant 2 in November 2007. The Kurume Plant was opened in August 2008 in Kurume. It houses the Daihatsu Group Kyushu Development Center which opened in 2014.

, the following vehicles are built by Daihatsu in Japan:

Overseas
Through its majority-owned subsidiary Astra Daihatsu Motor, Daihatsu operates two plants in Indonesia. One is in Karawang, and the other in Sunter, Jakarta. The Malaysian car manufacturer Perodua, in which Daihatsu has a minority stake, operates two factories in Rawang, Selangor.

Notes

References

External links

 

 
Vehicle manufacturing companies established in 1907
Car manufacturers of Japan
Companies based in Osaka Prefecture
Engine manufacturers of Japan
Toyota brands and marques
Toyota subsidiaries
Truck manufacturers of Japan
Diesel engine manufacturers
Japanese brands
Japanese companies established in 1907
Midori-kai
Toyota Group
2016 mergers and acquisitions
Companies formerly listed on the Tokyo Stock Exchange